The term iron law is derived from Goethe's "great, eternal iron laws" in his poem Das Göttliche, (On The Divine) and may refer to:

 Hoffman's iron law, regarding speaker system design
 Iron Law (painting), a 1984 painting by Odd Nerdrum
 Iron law of population, from Thomas Malthus' An Essay on the Principle of Population (1798)
 Iron law of wages, from Ferdinand Lassalle's Subsistence theory of wages (mid 19th century)
 Iron law of oligarchy, from Michels' Political Parties
 Iron law of processor performance, posited by Joel Emer
 Iron law of prohibition, from Cohen's How the Narcs Created Crack
 Iron law of bureaucracy, from Jerry Pournelle
 Operation Iron Law, a military operation conducted by the Israel Defense Forces in March 2011

See also
 Iron cage